The 2019–20 Rider Broncs men's basketball team represented Rider University in the 2019–20 NCAA Division I men's basketball season. The Broncs, led by 8th-year head coach Kevin Baggett, played their home games at the Alumni Gymnasium in Lawrenceville, New Jersey as members of the Metro Atlantic Athletic Conference. They finished the season 18–12 overall, 12–8 in MAAC play to finish in a tie for third place. Before they could face #6 seeded Niagara in the MAAC tournament quarterfinals, all postseason tournaments were cancelled amid the COVID-19 pandemic.

Previous season
The Broncs finished the 2018–19 season 16–15 overall, 11–7 in MAAC play to finish in a four-way tie for second place. As the 4th seed in the 2019 MAAC tournament, they were defeated by No. 5 seed Siena 81–87 in the quarterfinals.

Roster

Schedule and results

|-
!colspan=12 style=| Exhibition

|-
!colspan=12 style=| Regular season

|-
!colspan=12 style=| MAAC tournament
|-

|-

Source

References

Rider Broncs men's basketball seasons
Rider Broncs
Rider Broncs men's basketball
Rider Broncs men's basketball